The Faceoff on the Lake was an outdoor college ice hockey game played on February 18, 2023, at FirstEnergy Stadium in Cleveland between longtime rivals the Michigan Wolverines and the Ohio State Buckeyes. Ohio State defeated Michigan 4–2 in a rematch of the Frozen Diamond Faceoff outdoor game between the teams in 2012. The game marked the first ice hockey game ever played at FirstEnergy Stadium, and the attendance, announced at 45,523 fans, set a record for an outdoor college hockey game held at a neutral site.

Teams 
The game was announced by the Haslam Sports Group on August 22, 2023, as the first outdoor ice hockey game held at FirstEnergy Stadium and the first outdoor ice hockey game in Cleveland since 2012. This was the 41st outdoor college hockey game in the modern era. Michigan and Ohio State had previously played an outdoor game in Cleveland at Progressive Field on January 15, 2012, when the Wolverines defeated the Buckeyes 4–1 in the Frozen Diamond Faceoff.

Michigan Wolverines
The No. 4 Michigan Wolverines entered the game with a record of 20–9–2, and a 12–8–1 record in conference play. This was the Wolverines ninth outdoor game in their history, the most of any college ice hockey team.

Ohio State Buckeyes
The No. 10 Ohio State Buckeyes entered the game with a record of 17–11–3, and a 10–9–2 record in conference play. This was the Buckeyes fourth outdoor game in their history.

Game summary

The game was scoreless in the first period. Ohio State scored three goals in the second period, via goals by Cole McWard, a power play goal by Jake Wise and a shorthanded goal by Tyler Duke. Michigan finally got on the board late in the second via a goal by Gavin Brindley at 18:25. Michigan reduced Ohio State's lead to one goal via a goal by Eric Ciccolini at 8:46 in the third period. Ohio State responded with a goal by Stephen Halliday less than a minute later. The attendance of 45,523 was the largest in Ohio State history, surpassing the previous record of 45,021 set at the Hockey City Classic at TCF Bank Stadium on January 17, 2014.

Ohio State wore throwback jerseys featuring colors and numbers that resembled the Ohio State Buckeyes football team's jerseys of the early 1940s.

Number in parenthesis represents the player's total in goals or assists to that point of the season

Team rosters

 West served as reserve goaltender and did not see playing time.

Scratches
Michigan Wolverines: Brendan Miles, Jacob Truscott, Tyler Shea, Kienan Draper, Luke Hughes, Johnny Druskinis
Ohio State Buckeyes: John Larkin, Evan McIntyre, Dominic Vidoli, Mark Cheremeta, Gustaf Westlund, Ryan Snowden, Reilly Herbst

Officials 
 Referees — Brian Aaron, David Marcotte
 Linesmen — Justin Cornell, Jake Davis

Television 
The game was broadcast nationally by the Big Ten Network, and available online streaming via FuboTV.

See also
List of outdoor ice hockey games

References 

2022–23 NCAA Division I men's ice hockey season
Outdoor ice hockey games
Michigan Wolverines men's ice hockey
Ohio State Buckeyes men's ice hockey
February 2023 sports events in the United States
2023 in sports in Ohio
2020s in Cleveland
Ice hockey in Cleveland
Sports competitions in Cleveland